Achalinus (common name: odd-scaled snakes) is a genus of harmless snakes in the family Xenodermidae. They are found in Japan, Taiwan, China, and northern Vietnam. Ten species are currently recognized. Achalinus was previously placed in Colubridae (along with other xenodermids). Nicknamed ‘odd-scaled’ due to the fact their scales do not overlap one another like most snakes, but instead are spread out and lie individually similar to pieces of a puzzle. They are also known to be burrowers who crawl below the fallen leaves of the forest. 

*) Not including the nominate subspecies.

References

Xenodermidae
Reptiles of Japan
Snakes of Asia
Snake genera
Taxa named by Wilhelm Peters
Taxonomy articles created by Polbot